Capdeville, Capdevielle, Capdevilla or Capdevila is a surname, and may refer to;

Capdeville means head of town in Gascon dialect.

 Colette Capdevielle (born 1958), French politician
 Dinah Capdeville - Minas(Brazil) first aviator woman
 Paul Capdeville - Chilean tennis player
 Georges Capdeville - French football referee
 Constança Capdeville - Portuguese pianist, percussionist, music educator and composer
 Pierre Capdeville - French entomologist
 Jean-Patrick Capdevielle, French singer and songwriter
 Louis Capdevielle, French painter
 Paul Capdevielle - mayor of New Orleans
 Pierre Capdevielle (rugby union) - French rugby union footballer
 Pierre Capdevielle (musician) - French conductor, composer, and music critic
 Juana Capdevielle - Spanish educator and librarian
 Joan Capdevila - Spanish professional footballer
 Marc Capdevila - Spanish breaststroke swimmer

See also 

 Appeville

Surnames
Occitan-language surnames
Surnames of French origin